Anna Shaw may refer to:

 Anna Howard Shaw (1847 – 1919), leader of the women's suffrage movement in the United States
 Anna Shaw (serial killer) (1892 – 1958), one of America's first known female serial killers

See also
Ann Shaw (disambiguation)
Anne Shaw (disambiguation)